Vivek Yeshwant Ranadivé (born 7 October 1957) is an Indian-American business executive, engineer, author, speaker and philanthropist. Ranadivé is the founder and former chief executive officer (CEO) of TIBCO Software, a business intelligence software company, and of Teknekron Software Systems. Ranadivé is also a co-owner and chairman of the National Basketball Association's Sacramento Kings. In 2022, Ranadivé purchased a Minor League Baseball franchise, the Sacramento River Cats.

Early life and career 
Ranadivé grew up in the Juhu area of Mumbai, India, and was the youngest of three children. He studied at the Bombay International School, located at Babulnath, Mumbai. He is the nephew of the Indian Communist leaders Balkrishna Trimbak Ranadive and Ahilya Rangnekar. At 16, Ranadivé was accepted to MIT, but in the 1970s the Indian government did not release foreign currency for citizens to study abroad. Ranadivé talked his way into the office of the Reserve Bank of India and got the required foreign exchange for one quarter of the tuition.

After earning bachelor's and master's degrees in electrical engineering from MIT, he obtained an MBA from Harvard Business School in 1983. While at MIT, Ranadivé started his first company, a UNIX consulting company. He also held management and engineering positions with Ford Motor Company, M/A-Com Linkabit and Fortune Systems.

Teknekron Software Systems 
Teknekron Corp., a technology incubator, provided $250,000 in seed capital to Ranadivé in 1985 to found Teknekron Software Systems.

TIBCO 
In 1997, Ranadivé founded TIBCO Software Inc. with funding from Cisco and Reuters.

Bow Capital 
In 2016, Ranadivé founded Bow Capital, an early-stage startup investment firm in partnership with the University of California Regents. Among their investments are Eversight, Workramp, Jerry.ai, and Flex.

NBA

Golden State Warriors 
In 2010, Ranadivé became the co-owner and vice chairman of the Golden State Warriors, making him the first person of Indian descent to co-own an NBA franchise.

Sacramento Kings 
On 21 March 2013, it was announced that Ranadivé had joined Ronald Burkle and Mark Mastrov to attempt to purchase the Sacramento Kings. In order for Ranadivé to purchase the Kings, he had to sell his share of the Golden State Warriors. On 16 May 2013, it was announced that the group reached an agreement with the Maloof family to purchase 65% of the Kings for approximately $348 million. The NBA approved the sale on 28 May. Ranadivé made waves in 2014 when he proposed a style of play that included his team keeping one player on offense the entire time, creating a 4-on-5 defense on the other end.

Ranadivé has been criticized during his tenure as Kings owner and blamed for their lack of success on the court.

Works

Personal life 
Ranadivé and his former wife, Deborah Addicott, have three children: Aneel, Andre, and Anjali.

Anjali is an R&B singer-songwriter. She wrote and released her first single, "We Turn Up" in April 2014. Her second single was called "Nobody" and features Tyga. Anjali goes by the stage name "Nani", which means maternal grandmother in Hindi, as she has always respected elderly figures in her life. Anjali, who graduated from UC Berkeley with a marine science degree, founded Jaws & Paws, a marine and wildlife conservation nonprofit that spreads awareness for the conservation of sharks, polar bears, and tigers. In October 2015, she received the 2015 Paul Walker Ocean Leadership Award from the Monterey Bay Aquarium. She was also part of the 2022 NBA All-Star Celebrity Game.

Ranadivé coached his daughter's 12-and-under girls' basketball team despite, according to his own contention, never having touched a basketball until he reached his 40s. The story of Ranadivé's team's unlikely success was told by author Malcolm Gladwell in the pages of The New Yorker, and later included in Gladwell's 2013 book, David and Goliath.

From 2016 to 2020, Ranadivé donated $55,731 to Democratic candidates and causes.

References

External links 
 TIBCO Software Inc. Official Vivek Ranadivé bio
 Driving the Information Bus:Vivek Ranadivé

1957 births
Living people
American business writers
American people of Indian descent
American computer businesspeople
American computer scientists
American male writers of Indian descent
American motivational speakers
American philanthropists
American technology chief executives
American technology company founders
American technology writers
Businesspeople from Mumbai
Businesspeople in software
Golden State Warriors owners
Harvard Business School alumni
Indian emigrants to the United States
Massachusetts Institute of Technology alumni
Sacramento Kings owners
American male non-fiction writers